USS Gallatin (APA-169/LKA-169) was a Haskell-class attack transport acquired by the U.S. Navy during World War II for the task of transporting troops to and from combat areas.

World War II service 

The second ship to be named Gallatin by the Navy was built under Maritime Commission contract by the Oregon Shipbuilding Co., Portland, Oregon; launched 17 October 1944 sponsored by Mrs. Loran T. King of Portland; acquired by the Navy on a loan-charter basis 15 November 1944 and commissioned the same day at Astoria, Oregon.

Pacific Ocean operations 
 
After shakedown training out of San Pedro, California, Gallatin departed San Diego, California, 18 January 1945 with more than a thousand troops plus cargo. In the ensuing months she carried passengers and military cargo to ports throughout the Pacific Ocean, supporting the final blows which forced Japan to surrender. She visited Hawaii; the Marshall Islands; the New Hebrides; New Caledonia; the Philippines; New Guinea; and the Admiralty Islands.

End-of-war operations 

She sailed from the Philippines for the U.S. West Coast and arrived San Francisco, California, with nearly 1,500 weary war veterans 10 August 1945. Eight days later she headed west again with as many troops for garrison duty at Lingayen Gulf, Philippine Islands. During October she steamed to Japan with vehicles, stores, and advance elements of the Army's 25th Division which she landed at Honshū as occupation forces.

Bringing the troops back home 
 
Assigned to "Operation Magic Carpet" duty, Gallatin carried nearly 2,000 marines and other military veterans home from the Philippines and Hawaii. She reached San Diego, California, with her veteran passengers 20 November 1945, and then made another "Magic-Carpet" voyage to the Philippines which terminated at San Diego 25 January 1946.

Post-war decommissioning 

After transiting the Panama Canal, she decommissioned at Newport News, Virginia, 23 April 1946; was returned to War Shipping Administration (WSA) the following day; and was placed in the National Defense Reserve Fleet, James River, Virginia. She was struck from the Navy List on 8 May 1946. In 1969 she was classified “general cargo” as opposed to “troop transport” and was redesignated LKA-169. Returned to the Maritime Commission in April 1946 and stricken from the Navy List in May, she was in the reserve fleet until sold for scrapping in September 1983.

References

External links 
 NavSource Online: Amphibious Photo Archive - APA / LKA-169 Gallatin

World War II amphibious warfare vessels of the United States
Haskell-class attack transports
Gallatin County, Illinois
Gallatin County, Kentucky
Gallatin County, Montana
Ships built in Portland, Oregon
1944 ships